Ocean Shores  may refer to:
 Ocean Shores, New South Wales, Australia
 Ocean Shores, Washington, USA, founded circa 1962
 Ocean Shores, a residential development in Tiu Keng Leng in Hong Kong
 'Ocean Shores', a fictional Southern California town designed by the Klasky-Csupo animation studio as a setting for the Rocket Power cartoon series